Nationale Sluitingprijs is a semi classic European bicycle race held annually in Putte (Kapellen), Belgium. Since 2005, the race is organized as a 1.1 event on the UCI Europe Tour. Established in 1929, it is one of the last European races of the season.

Winners

External links
 

Cycle races in Belgium
UCI Europe Tour races
Recurring sporting events established in 1929
1929 establishments in Belgium